The Hardy Boys: The Mystery of the Applegate Treasure is a 1956 American TV serial that was broadcast in episodes of The Mickey Mouse Club. It was based on The Hardy Boys stories  in particular The Tower Treasure.

According to Diabolique magazine "Watching the serial today it’s very much an item of its time, but Kirk’s performance is a wonder – relaxed, energetic, a complete natural; he’s not as conventionally good looking as Considine but he seems more at home on screen. He was the perfect Disney star."

Cast
Tim Considine as Frank Hardy
Tommy Kirk as Joe Hardy
Sarah Selby as Aunt Gertrude

References

External links
Mystery of the Applegate Treasure at IMDb
Page at Mickey Mouse Club

1956 American television series debuts
The Mickey Mouse Club serials
Television shows based on The Hardy Boys